Christine Buchegger (19 November 1942 – 3 March 2014) was an Austrian theater and television actress, born in Vienna, Austria.

Biography 
Christine Buchegger was born in Vienna to Maria Buchegger originating from Pettenbach in Upper Austria. After finishing school she attended the Max Reinhardt Seminar, the School of Drama at the University of Music and Performing Arts in Vienna, Austria, for two years. Bucheggers first engagement was at the Vereinigten Bühnen Graz in Styria, afterwards she worked at the Linz State Theatre (Landestheater Linz) and the Wiener Volkstheater.

In 1972 she moved to Munich to play at the Bavarian State Theatre (Bayerische Staatsschauspiel) where she continued working until the 1990s. Important roles there included Fontanelle in Edward Bonds Lear (1973), Eliante in Der Menschenfeind (1975), Irina in Drei Schwestern (1978, directed by Ingmar Bergman), Kassandra in Agamemnon (1978), the lead role in Ibsens Hedda Gabler (1979) and the 'Buhlschaft' in Jedermann at the Salzburg Festival 1979 with Maximilian Schell in the lead role.

From 1980 she took a break from acting and returned 1984 to the stage performing Johanne Luise Heiberg in Per Olov Enquists Aus dem Leben der Regenwürmer and the Mutter in Frühlings Erwachen (1992).

Buchegger died on 3 March 2014 in Munich unexpectedly during minor surgery. She was 71 years old and is buried at the Nordfriedhof in Munich in an urn grave.

Filmography

 1960: Glocken läuten überall
 1961: Das Land des Lächelns
 1964: Die Schneekönigin
 1966: Das Märchen
 1970: Rebell in der Soutane
 1971: Der Fall Eleni Voulgari
 1972: Sultan zu verkaufen
 1972: Das Hohelied
 1972: The Salzburg Connection
 1973: The Pedestrian
 1973: 
 1975: Die Verschwörung des Fiesco zu Genua
 1975: Derrick - Season 2, Episode 2: "Tod am Bahngleis"
 1975: Lady Dracula (released: 1978)
 1976: Graf Yoster: "Der Ton macht die Musik"
 1976: Graf Yoster: "Undank ist der Welt Lohn"
 1976: 
 1977: 
 1977: 
 1977: Travesties
 1978: Wilhelm Meisters Lehrjahre
 1978: Derrick - Season 5, Episode 1: "Der Fotograf"
 1979: Derrick - Season 6, Episode 3: "Schubachs Rückkehr"
 1980: From the Life of the Marionettes
 1985: Wind von Südost
 1986: Derrick: "Ein eiskalter Hund"
 1989: Derrick - Season 16, Episode 7: "Schrei in der Nacht"
 1991: Derrick: "Penthaus"
 1992: Mord im Wald
 1993: Dann eben mit Gewalt
 1993: Der rote Vogel
 1994: Endloser Abschied
 1994:  (TV series)
 1994: Derrick: "Nachts, als sie nach Hause lief"
 1996: Liebe, Leben, Tod
 1999: Frische Ware
 1999: Die Rache der Carola Waas
 1999: Der Schandfleck
 2000: Nicht mit uns
 2002: Rosamunde Pilcher: Mit den Augen der Liebe

References

External links 
 

1942 births
2014 deaths
Austrian film actresses
Austrian stage actresses
Austrian television actresses
20th-century Austrian actresses
21st-century Austrian actresses
Actresses from Vienna